Stancil  Powell aka Wrinkle Meat (February 11, 1889 - October 14, 1957) was a professional football player who played in the National Football League during the 1923 season. That season, he joined the NFL's Oorang Indians. The Indians were a team based in LaRue, Ohio, composed only of Native Americans, and coached by Jim Thorpe. Powell was an enrolled citizen of the Eastern Band of Cherokee Indians.

References

Uniform Numbers of the NFL

Notes

Eastern Band Cherokee people
Native American players of American football
Carlisle Indians football players
Oorang Indians players
1889 births
1957 deaths
Haskell Indian Nations University alumni
Players of American football from North Carolina
People from Cherokee, North Carolina
20th-century Native Americans